The 2010 Aspria Tennis Cup was a professional tennis tournament played on outdoor red clay courts. It was part of the 2010 ATP Challenger Tour. It took place in Milan, Italy between 14 and 20 June 2010.

ATP entrants

Seeds

 Rankings are as of June 7, 2010.

Other entrants
The following players received wildcards into the singles main draw:
  Fabio Colangelo
  Enrico Fioravante
  Roberto Marcora
  Gianluca Naso

The following players received entry from the qualifying draw:
  Evgeny Donskoy
  Yann Marti
  Bruno Rodríguez
  Marc Sieber

Champions

Singles

 Frederico Gil def.  Máximo González, 6–1, 7–5

Doubles

 Daniele Bracciali /  Rubén Ramírez Hidalgo def.  James Cerretani /  Jeff Coetzee, 6–4, 7–5

References
Official website
ITF search 

Aspria Tennis Cup
Aspria Tennis Cup
Clay court tennis tournaments